Trevor Casper (May 21, 1993 – March 24, 2015) was a state trooper for the Wisconsin State Patrol. On his first solo assignment, Casper was shot and killed in Fond du Lac attempting to apprehend a bank robbery and murder suspect on March 24, 2015.
  
He was the youngest police officer killed in the line of duty in Wisconsin.

Early life and career 
Casper was born in Sheboygan, Wisconsin, and later moved to Kiel with his family, where he was a 2011 graduate of Kiel High School and was on the school's soccer and wrestling teams. He studied at Lakeshore Technical College in Cleveland, Wisconsin, where he graduated in May 2014 with a degree in criminal justice. In college, he was the student government president and active in the color guard.
 
Casper began his training to become a Wisconsin State Trooper at the Wisconsin State Patrol Academy at Fort McCoy on July 13, 2014. In December that year, Casper was sworn in as a trooper.

Death 
The suspect, Steven Snyder, was believed to have robbed a bank in Wausaukee, Wisconsin earlier on March 24, 2015. Approximately one hour after the bank robbery, Snyder abandoned the vehicle he was driving, shot dead 59-year-old Thomas C. Christ, and stole a second vehicle.
 
Casper located the second vehicle as it was being driven southbound on Interstate 41 in Fond du Lac and began following it. He was directing Trooper Clarissa Justmann, Sgt. Andrew Hyer, and Capt. Tony Burrell to their location when Snyder pulled into a Pick 'n Save supermarket parking lot and stopped. Snyder discharged nine 5.7mm  shots from an FN Five-seven pistol at Casper, who was hit by three rounds in the neck, chest and left hand. Casper, though mortally wounded, discharged 12 .40-caliber rounds from his Glock duty weapon, and struck Snyder once in the chest, fatally wounding him. Casper was pronounced dead en route to the hospital.

It was announced on July 12, 2016, that Casper would be inducted into the State of Wisconsin Fire & Police Hall of Fame.

The suspect 
Police confirmed 38-year-old Steven Timothy Snyder from Michigan shot and killed Casper in the shootout. Snyder was also killed in the exchange of gunfire.

Response and reactions 
Before the shooting involving Casper, the Fond du Lac Police Department had been investigating a bank robbery just blocks away. The day following the shooting, Governor Scott Walker issued a statement saying, "Trooper Trevor Casper was killed while bravely serving his community and doing his duty to keep our citizens safe.  Tonette and I are praying for Trooper Casper's family and our thoughts are with them and the broader law enforcement community at this difficult time."

References

External links 
Wisconsin State Trooper Trevor Casper funeral procession, YouTube

1993 births
2015 deaths
American police officers killed in the line of duty
2015 murders in the United States
People from Sheboygan, Wisconsin
People from Kiel, Wisconsin